The PJSC Beriev Aircraft Company, formerly Beriev Design Bureau, is a Russian aircraft manufacturer (design office prefix Be), specializing in amphibious aircraft.

The company was founded in Taganrog in the 1934 as OKB-49 by Georgy Mikhailovich Beriev, and since that time has designed and produced more than 20 different models of aircraft for civilian and military purposes, as well as customized models. Today the company employs some 3000 specialists and is developing and manufacturing amphibious aircraft.

Pilots flying Beriev seaplanes have broken 228 world aviation records. The records are registered and acknowledged by the Fédération Aéronautique Internationale.

History
Georgy Mikhailovich Beriev founded the design bureau that bears his name at Taganrog in 1932. The traditional focus of the Beriyev Design Bureau has been the development of seaplanes for military and civilian use. The Bureau was moved to Krasnoyarsk in Siberia in 1942 to avoid destruction in World War II, and returned to Taganrog in 1945. In November 1989 Beriev became the only defense industry enterprise to win the Prize for Quality awarded by the Soviet Government.

Aircraft 

 Beriev MBR-2/MP-1, multi-purpose flying boat, 1935
 Beriev Be-2/KOR-1/KR-2, reconnaissance seaplane, 1936; NATO codename "Mote"
 Beriev MBR-7, prototype short-range reconnaissance/bomber flying boat, 1937
 Beriev MDR-5, long-range reconnaissance/bomber flying boat, 1938
 Beriev B-10, high-speed fighter project, 1939
 Beriev Be-4/KOR-2, parasol-wing flying boat, 1940; NATO codename "Mug"
 Beriev Be-5/KOR-3, three-seat, single engine, catapult-launched seaplane, not built
 Beriev MDR-8, unbuilt long-range reconnaissance aircraft, 1939
 Beriev MDRT, long-range maritime reconnaissance/torpedo bomber, 1940
 Beriev BB-282F, twin-engine armored bomber, 1942
 Beriev MDR-10, long-range maritime reconnaissance, 1942
 Beriev LL-143, prototype twin-engine flying boat, precursor of Be-6, 1945
 Beriev Be-8, passenger/liaison amphibian, 1947; NATO codename "Mole" or "Mode"
 Beriev Printsessa, projected large six-engine passenger/patrol flying boat, 1947
 Beriev Be-6, flying boat used for firefighting duty, 1949; NATO codename "Madge"
 Beriev R-1, experimental jet-powered flying boat, 1952
 Beriev Be-1, prototype wing-in-ground effect (WIG) aircraft, 1956
 Beriev Be-10/M-10, jet-engined flying boat, 1956; NATO codename "Mallow"
 Beriev Be-12/M-12 Chayka, Amphibious aircraft, similar in function to the Canadair CL-415, used for anti-submarine warfare, based upon the Be-6, 1960; NATO codename "Mail"
 Beriev Be-16, heavy military transport project, 1959
 An-Be-20, projected 1960s trijet regional airliner developed in cooperation with Antonov; cancelled in favor of the Yakovlev Yak-40
 Beriev S-13, a clone of the Lockheed U-2 reconnaissance plane, 1961.
 Beriev Be-24, amphibious airliner project, 1963
 Beriev Be-26, projected amphibious ASW aircraft
 Beriev Be-30, light single-engine airliner project, 1965
 Beriev Be-32, VTOL aircraft in various configurations, 1965
 Beriev Be-30, regional airliner and utility transport aircraft, 1967; NATO codename "Cuff"
 Beriev Be-40, airliner project, 1968
 Antonov An-30, aerial cartography development of the Antonov An-24, 1971
 Bartini Beriev VVA-14, an amphibious anti-submarine aircraft, only prototypes were produced, 1972
 Beriev Be-32, a multipurpose airplane meant for cargo/passenger transport, patrol and expeditions. Modernized version of Be-30, 1976
 Tupolev Tu-142MR, Tu-142MK's modified by Beriev as submarine communications relay aircraft, 1977
 Beriev A-50 Shmel, a modified Ilyushin Il-76 modified into an AWACS role, 1985; NATO codename "Mainstay"
 Beriev A-60, a Ilyushin Il-76 converted into an airborne laser laboratory, 1981
 Beriev A-40 Albatros, the largest multipurpose amphibian airplane in the world, 1986; NATO codename "Mermaid". Cancelled due to the breakup of the Soviet Union, but later revived as the A-42.
 Beriev A-42 Albatros, prototype SAR variant of A-40, 1990. Combined with the A-44 in 1993 to form a multi-role aircraft. Prototype finished in 2006 and an R&D agreement signed by the Defense Ministry, but was cancelled in 2011. In 2019, the Russian Navy announced an order for three A-42s.
 Beriev A-44, military patrol version of A-42, 1990. Combined with the A-42 in 1993.
 Beriev Be-112 proposed twin-engined propeller amphibian airplane, 1995
 Beriev Be-103 Bekas, a light amphibian, intended for passenger transport, medical aid, patrol and tourism, 1997
 Beriev Be-200 Altair, a large multipurpose amphibian airplane, 1998
 Beriev Be-115, amphibious aircraft project, 1999
 Beriev A-100, a modified Ilyushin Il-76MD-90A AWACS that will succeed the A-50 and A-50U, 2017
 Beriev Be-101 proposed single-engine light amphibian
 Beriev Be-2500 Neptun, a proposed super-heavy amphibian cargo aircraft with a max takeoff weight of 2500 metric tons (planned)

References

External links

 Official site in Russian
 US division
 Beriev Aircraft Corp. in the Taganrog Business Directory

 
United Aircraft Corporation
Aircraft manufacturers of the Soviet Union
Emergency services equipment makers
Companies based in Rostov Oblast
Russian brands
Design bureaus